The Kol people referred to tribals of Chotanagpur in Eastern Parts of India. The Mundas, Oraons, Hos and Bhumijs were called Kols by British.

It also refers to some tribe and caste of south-east Uttar Pradesh. They are mostly landless and dependent on forest produce to make a living, they are Hindus and are designated a Scheduled Caste under India's system of positive discrimination. The tribe has several exogamous clans, including the Brahmin‚ Barawire, Bhil, Chero, Monasi, Rautia, Rojaboria‚ Rajput and Thakuria. They speak the Baghelkhandi dialect. Around 1 million live in Madhya Pradesh while another 5 lakh live in Uttar Pradesh.

Once spelled "Cole", the swaths of land they inhabited in the 19th-century were called "Colekan".

Etymology
Kol was generic term for non-Aryan people in Chotanagpur such as Oraon and Munda. The term Kola mentioned in Rigveda. According to legend, Yayati, the son of Nahus divided his kingdom for his five sons. Then after ten generation, India was divided among four brothers; Pandya, Krala, Kola and Chola. According to Markandeya Purana, the Aryan princess Suratha was defeated by some unclean tribe called Kolabidhansinah means slayer of Pig. According to Herr Jelinghans, Kolarian tribes who eat pig were considered unclean by the hindus. Another meaning of Kol is Pig.

History
Colonel Edward Tuite Dalton has refferd to non-Aryan Kolarian and Dravidian tribal of Chotanagpur as Kol such as Munda, Oraon, Ho, Santal, Bhumij, Juang etc in his writings in 1867. According to him the word is epithets of abuse applied by the Brahmin races to the aboriginals who opposed their settlements. In Chotanagpur, the term kol generally applied to Munda and Oraon. Although Oraon and Munda celebrate same festivals, but they don't intermarry among themselves.

Later, Colonel Dalton classified Oraon as Dravidian and Munda and other Kol such as Ho, Bhumij as Kolarian  after observing their customs and traditions which were distinct.

References

Scheduled Castes of Uttar Pradesh
Scheduled Tribes of Odisha
Scheduled Tribes of Madhya Pradesh
Scheduled Tribes of Chhattisgarh